YFC may refer to the following:

National Federation of Young Farmers' Clubs, a British youth club which helps support young people in agriculture and the countryside
Young Farmers Club, regional clubs affiliated with New Zealand Young Farmers
Youth for Christ, a Christian organization often abbreviated to YFC
The IATA airport code for Fredericton International Airport, New Brunswick, Canada
Yadanarbon F.C., an association football club in Myanmar
Ypiranga Futebol Clube, a Brazilian professional association football club

France / Belgique
Youth For climate, mouvement of young People for à social and climate justice